Paul Birch (born Paul Lowery Smith; January 13, 1912 – May 24, 1969) was an American actor. He was a film star of 39 movies, 50 stage dramas, and numerous television series, including the Hallmark Hall of Fame (1951).

Early life 
Birch was born Paul Lowery Smith in Atmore, Alabama. He attended Alabama Polytechnic Institute.

Career

Television
In the late 1950s, Birch starred, along with William Campbell, in the syndicated Canadian series Cannonball (1958), a half-hour drama/adventure show about truck drivers. He also was a regular in The Court of Last Resort on NBC in 1957-1958.

He also appeared in one 1958 episode, Torn Flag, of the western series “The Restless Gun”.

In the mid 1950s he appeared in magazine and TV ads as the first widely publicized "Cowboy" Marlboro Man.

In 1959, Birch was cast as Sergeant Major Carmody, with Doug McClure as  Corporal Jenkins, in the episode "The Face of Courage" of the NBC western series, Riverboat, starring Darren McGavin and Burt Reynolds. In the story line, amid the threat of Sioux attack, Carmody commandeers the vessel, the Enterprise, while it is delivering military cargo to an Army outpost on the Missouri River. Joanna Moore appears in the episode as Kitty McGuire.

He appeared as President Grant in the 1960 episode "Mr. Simpson" of ABC's Black Saddle western series starring Peter Breck as Clay Culhane, a gunfighter-turned-lawyer. He also portrayed President Grant in two episodes of The Adventures of Rin Tin Tin.

He also had a recurring role as Captain Carpenter, the boss of Lt. Phillip Gerard (Barry Morse) in the first two seasons of ABC's adventure/drama series The Fugitive, starring David Janssen.

Stage
Birch appeared on Broadway in a production of The Caine Mutiny Court-Martial (1954-1955). He portrayed both Union Army General Ulysses S. Grant and Confederate General Robert E. Lee in several historical plays.

He was among the original members of the Pasadena Playhouse, the first actor to be one of that group's repertory players.

Film
Birch appeared as the police captain with the megaphone in Rebel Without A Cause (1955), and was one of the first to be "disintegrated" in the original movie The War of the Worlds (1953).

He starred in some low-budget science-fiction films in the 1950s, including The Beast with a Million Eyes (1955), Day the World Ended (1955), Not of This Earth (1957), and the cult classic Queen of Outer Space (1958).  Birch also had small roles in It's a Mad, Mad, Mad, Mad World (1963) and Dead Heat on a Merry-Go-Round (1967).

Teaching
While he acted at the Pasadena Playhouse, he also was "employed full-time as an instructor and director working with students in the Playhouse College of Theatre Arts."

Personal life
Birch was married twice and was survived by his second wife, the former Betsy Ross Smith (another source gives her name as Barbara) and their three children, Don, Jennifer, and Michael. From his first marriage to Margaret Farish, he had a daughter named Cindy, whose son is actor Ned Luke (born 1958).

Death
Birch died of cancer at age 57 on May 24, 1969, at St. George's, the capital of Grenada. Survived by his widow and three children, he is buried in a cemetery outside the capital.

Selected filmography

 The Royal Mounted Rides Again (1945) - Highwayman #2 (uncredited)
 The Daltons Ride Again (1945) - Wilkins Henchman (uncredited)
 Adventure (1945) - First Mate (uncredited)
 The Fighting Guardsman (1946) - Sergeant (uncredited)
 The Scarlet Horseman (1946) - Ace (uncredited)
 Till the End of Time (1946) - Marine Wanting Farm (uncredited)
 Check Your Guns (1948) - Member The Plainsmen (uncredited)
 The Third Man (1949) - Military Policeman (uncredited)
 Bonzo Goes to College (1952) - Coach Duff (uncredited)
 Assignment – Paris! (1952) - Col. Mannix (uncredited)
 The War of the Worlds (1953) - Alonzo Hogue (uncredited)
 The System (1953) - Police Lt. Gordon (uncredited)
 The Eddie Cantor Story (1953) - (uncredited)
 Ride Clear of Diablo (1954) - Fred Kenyon
 Cattle Queen of Montana (1954) - Col. Carrington
 Man Without a Star (1955) - Mark Toliver
 Strange Lady in Town (1955) - Sheriff
 Five Guns West (1955) - J.C. Haggard
 The Beast with a Million Eyes (1955) - Allan Kelley
 Apache Woman (1955) - Sheriff
 Rebel Without a Cause (1955) - Police Chief (uncredited)
 Day the World Ended (1955) - Jim Maddison
 The Fighting Chance (1955) - Auctioneer
 When Gangland Strikes (1956) - Sheriff Mack McBride
 The Fastest Gun Alive (1956) - Yellowfork Sheriff Bill Toledo
 The White Squaw (1956) - Thad Arnold
 Everything But the Truth (1956) - Sen. Winter
 Gun for a Coward (1957) - Andy Niven
 Not of This Earth (1957) - Paul Johnson
 The Tattered Dress (1957) - Prosecutor Frank Mitchell
 The Spirit of St. Louis (1957) - Blythe (uncredited)
 Cheyenne (1957, TV Series) - Col. Preston
 The 27th Day (1957) - Admiral
 Joe Dakota (1957) - Frank Weaver
 The World Was His Jury (1958) - Martin Ranker
 Gunman's Walk (1958) - Bob Selkirk
 The Restless Gun (1958) Episode "The Torn Flag"
 Wild Heritage (1958) - Jacob 'Jake' Breslin
 Queen of Outer Space (1958) - Prof. Konrad
 The Gun Runners (1958) - Sy Phillips
 Gunmen from Laredo (1959) - Marshal Matt Crawford
 Too Soon to Love (1960)
 Portrait in Black (1960) - Detective Lieutenant
 Pay or Die (1960) - Mayor
 The Dark at the Top of the Stairs (1960) - Jonah Mills (uncredited)
 Two Rode Together (1961) - Judge Edward Purcell
 Sea Hunt (7th Jan 1961), Season 4, Episode 1, Point of No Return
 A Public Affair (1962) - Malcomb Hardy
 The Man Who Shot Liberty Valance (1962) - Mayor Winder
 It's a Mad, Mad, Mad, Mad World (1963) - Santa Rosita Police Department Officer at the intersection (uncredited)
 The Raiders (1963) - Paul King
 The Glory Guys (1965) - Commanding General
 Dead Heat on a Merry-Go-Round (1966) - Bill Simpson (uncredited)
 A Covenant with Death (1967) - Governor
 Welcome to Hard Times (1967) - Mr. Fee
 Counterpoint (1968) - (uncredited) (final film role)

See also

References

External links

1912 births
1969 deaths
Male actors from Alabama
People from Atmore, Alabama
American male film actors
American male stage actors
American male television actors
20th-century American male actors
Deaths from cancer in Grenada